Beagle Island is an island lying northeast of Darwin Island in the Danger Islands off the east end of Joinville Island. It was named by the UK Antarctic Place-Names Committee in 1963 after HMS Beagle (Captain Robert FitzRoy), due to its proximity to Darwin Island.

Wildlife

Beale Island has hundreds of thousands of Adelie penguins nesting during each summer. There are dozens of sheathbills, skuas, and pintados seen on every shoreline. There are leopard seals often seen in the water.

Geology

Beagle Island consists of Mesozoic diorite related to the subduction complex ranging from Antarctica to Alaska during the Cretaceous Period (80-120 million years ago).

See also 
 List of Antarctic and sub-Antarctic islands

References

 

Islands of the Joinville Island group